"The Light You Burned" is a song by Australian group, Hilltop Hoods. It was released in December 2009 as the third and final single from their fifth studio album, State of the Art. The song peaked at number 62 on the ARIA Charts in March 2010.

Track listing

Personnel
 Artwork (Graphic Design) - Benjamin Funnell
 Artwork (Illustration) - John Engelhardt
 Mastered - Neville Clark
 Mixed, Produced - Matthew Lambert

Charts

Release history

References

2009 singles
2009 songs
Hilltop Hoods songs
Songs written by Suffa
Songs written by MC Pressure
Obese Records singles